Pichaqani (Aymara pichaqa, phichaqa, piqacha a big needle, -ni a suffix, "the one with a big needle", also spelled Pichacani) is a  mountain in the Bolivian Andes. It is located in the La Paz Department, Inquisivi Province, Colquiri Municipality. Pichaqani lies northeast of Kuntur Samaña. The  Qala Uta River ("stone house" river, Khala Uta) flows along its western slope.

References 

Mountains of La Paz Department (Bolivia)